Dalbergia lanceolaria is a species of tree in the subfamily Faboideae and tribe Dalbergieae.  It is a medium-sized tree growing to 20m tall and is native to: India, Sri Lanka, Nepal, Burma and Indo-China (its Vietnamese names include vảy ốc, bạt ong or trắc múi giáo).

The bark of the tree is traditionally used as an analgesic and anti-diarrhoeal. The apiose isoflavone compound lanceolarin is found in its root bark.

Because it produces new stems (ramets), it is recommended for reforestation projects on degraded land where seeds are unlikely to grow successfully.

Subspecies 
Plants of the World Online includes:
 D. lanceolaria  var. errans (Craib) Niyomdham - Indo-China
 synonym: D. errans Craib
 D. lanceolaria  var. lakhonensis (Gagnep.) Niyomdham & P.H.Hô - Indo-China
 synonyms: D. lakhonensis Gagnep, D. lanceolaria var. maymyensis (Craib) Thoth, D. maymyensis Craib
 D. lanceolaria subsp. paniculata (Roxb.) Thoth. - Indian Subcontinent to Indo-China
 synonyms include: Amerimnon paniculatum (Roxb.) Kuntze, D. hemsleyi Prain, D. paniculata Roxb.

Gallery

References

External links

lanceolaria
Trees of Indo-China
Trees of the Indian subcontinent